Fae or FAE may refer to:

Arts, entertainment, and media
 F-A-E Sonata, a composition jointly written by Robert Schumann, Johannes Brahms, and Albert Dietrich
 Fae folk, another name for fairies
 Fae folk, a generic term for a diverse collection of non-human beings in the television series Carnival Row
 Fate Accelerated Edition, a version of the Fate generic role-playing game system

People
 Fae Ellington (born 1953), Jamaican media personality
 Baby Fae (1984–1984), American xenotransplant recipient
 Emerse Faé (born 1984), French-born Ivorian footballer

Also a post-nominal for a Fellow of The Academy of Experts.

Places
 Vágar Airport (IATA airport code FAE), Faroe Islands

Science and technology
 Fatty acid ester
 Fetal alcohol effects
 Fuel-air explosive

Other uses
 Frequent Air Exchange, among mushroom growers.
 Field application engineer
 Fuerza Aérea Ecuatoriana, the Ecuadorian Air Force
 Foundation for Accounting Education, a continuing education organization within the New York State Society of CPAs
 Fundamental attribution error, in social psychology
 Spanish Air Force, Fuerza Aérea Española
 French Antarctic Expedition

See also
 Fay (disambiguation)